Özlem Ceren Dursun (born 8 December 2003) is a Turkish Olympian cross-country skier.

Early years
Özlem Ceren Dursun was born in Gerede district of Bolu Province, Turkey on 8 December 2003.

Sports career
Dursun started skiing sport at the age of eleven. She performs cross-country skiing. She is a member of Akut Sports Club. In 2019, she was admitted to the national team.

She participated at the sprint and 5km classical events at the 2020 Winter Youth Olympics held in Lausanne, Switzerland.

She competes at the 2022 Winter Olympics in Beijing, China.

See also
Turkey at the 2022 Winter Olympics

References

2003 births
Living people
People from Gerede
Sportspeople from Bolu
Turkish female cross-country skiers
Olympic cross-country skiers of Turkey
Cross-country skiers at the 2022 Winter Olympics
Cross-country skiers at the 2020 Winter Youth Olympics
21st-century Turkish sportswomen